hawk-i is a medical insurance program run by the U.S. state of Iowa. It provides health care coverage for low-income children of citizens and qualified aliens. It is designed to supplement Medicaid by covering children whose family's income is above the Medicaid limit but below the hawk-i limit.

External links
 Official website
 Maximus (3rd party administrative contractor) page

Medicare and Medicaid (United States)